Long Way Home may refer to:

Film and television
A Long Way Home (1981 film), an American television film directed by Robert Markowitz
The Long Way Home (1985 film), starring Richard Moir
The Long Way Home, a 1989 documentary directed by Michael Apted
The Long Way Home, a 1995 Irish drama film directed by Paddy Breathnach
The Long Way Home (1997 film), a documentary directed by Mark Jonathan Harris
The Long Way Home, a 1998 television film directed by Glenn Jordan and starring Jack Lemmon
The Long Way Home (2013 film), a Turkish drama film
The Long Way Home (2015 film), a South Korean war film
Long Way Home (2018 film), a Brazilian drama film

Literature 
A Long Way Home (book), a 2013 autobiography by Saroo Brierley
The Long Way Home (novel) or Keepers of the House, a 1982 novel by Lisa St Aubin de Terán
The Long Way Home (Buffy comic), a Buffy the Vampire Slayer comic book series
The Long Way Home, a novel by Poul Anderson

Music

Albums
Long Way Home (Dokken album), 2002
Long Way Home (Låpsley album), 2016
Long Way Home (Troy Cassar-Daley album) or the title song, 2002
A Long Way Home (album) or the title song, by Dwight Yoakam, 1998
The Long Way Home (Confession album) or the title song, 2011
The Long Way Home (Krept and Konan album) or the title song, 2015
The Long Way Home (Show of Hands album) or the title song, 2016
The Long Way Home (Terri Clark album), 2009
Long Way Home, by Ginny Owens, 2006
The Long Way Home, by Donots, 2010
The Long Way Home, by Jarvis Church, 2008

Songs
"Long Way Home" (Steven Curtis Chapman song), 2012
"Long Way Home", by 5 Seconds of Summer from 5 Seconds of Summer, 2014
"Long Way Home", by ATB from Addicted to Music, 2003
"Long Way Home", by Don Henley from I Can't Stand Still, 1982
"Long Way Home", by Hayes Carll from Little Rock, 2005
"Long Way Home", by the Monkees from Pool It!, 1987
"Long Way Home", by the Offspring from Splinter, 2003
"Long Way Home", by Soul Asylum from Made to Be Broken, 1986
"Long Way Home", by Stone Temple Pilots from Shangri-La Dee Da, 2001
"Long Way Home", by Tom Waits from Orphans: Brawlers, Bawlers & Bastards, 2006
"Long Way Home", by Toni Braxton from Libra, 2005
"Long Way Home", by Todd Tilghman as his 2020 winning song in season 18 of the American The Voice  
"The Long Way Home", by the Birthday Massacre from Hide and Seek, 2012
"The Long Way Home," by Bob Seger and the Silver Bullet Band from The Fire Inside, 1991
"The Long Way Home", by Mary Chapin Carpenter from Time* Sex* Love*, 2001
"The Long Way Home", by Neil Diamond 1973

See also
Take the Long Way Home (disambiguation)
Long Way from Home (disambiguation)
Long Walk Home (disambiguation)